Morass Bay is a rural locality in the local government area (LGA) of Central Highlands in the Central LGA region of Tasmania. The 2016 census recorded a population of 4 for the state suburb of Morass Bay.

History 
Morass Bay is a confirmed locality.

Geography
The waters of Arthurs Lake form the north-western boundary.

Road infrastructure 
Route C525 (Arthurs Lake Road) runs through from south to south-west.

References

Towns in Tasmania
Localities of Central Highlands Council